Bobo's in the bush is the Dutch version of I'm a Celebrity...Get Me Out of Here!.

Series
- Winner

Season 1
Was shot in Borneo, Indonesia and ran from 20 March to 27 June 2003 on RTL. There were ten contestants:

Season 2
8 March 2004 to 3 July 2004 on RTL. There were ten contestants:

Season 3
Was shot in Brazil and Argentina and ran from 7 March to 16 May 2005 on RTL. There were ten contestants:

References

I'm a Celebrity...Get Me Out of Here!
2003 Dutch television series debuts
2005 Dutch television series endings
2000s Dutch television series
RTL 4 original programming